Trongfjorden is a fjord between Surnadal Municipality and Tingvoll Municipality in Møre og Romsdal county, Norway. On the south end, the fjord branches off into several other fjord arms: Hamnesfjorden, Surnadalsfjorden, Stangvikfjorden, and Ålvundfjorden.

References

Fjords of Møre og Romsdal
Tingvoll
Surnadal